Cross My Heart is a 1946 American comedy film directed by John Berry and starring Betty Hutton, Sonny Tufts and Rhys Williams. It was a remake of the 1937 film True Confession, which was itself based on the 1934 French play Mon Crime written by Georges Berr and Louis Verneuil.

Synopsis
A chorus girl by the name of Peggy Harper (Betty Hutton) quits her job as a chorus girl to get a daytime job to see her lawyer boyfriend Oliver Clark (Sonny Tufts) more often. She gets a job as a private secretary for a Mr. Wallace Brent.

One day at the office, he keeps pawing Peggy and trying to "neck" with her, and so she flees the office, all to come back the same night to get her coat, purse, and hat, and also run into the police. Peggy Harper is accused of murdering her boss. She confesses just so she can get Oliver to be her lawyer and defend her at the jury to showcase his talent.

Cast
 Betty Hutton as Peggy Harper 
 Sonny Tufts as Oliver Clarke  
 Rhys Williams as Prosecutor  
 Ruth Donnelly as Eve Harper  
 Al Bridge as Det. Flynn  
 Iris Adrian as Miss Baggart  
 Howard Freeman as Wallace Brent  
 Lewis L. Russell as Judge  
 Michael Chekhov as Peter

References

Bibliography
 Fetrow, Alan G. Feature films, 1950-1959: a United States Filmography. McFarland & Company, 1999.

External links

1946 films
American comedy films
American black-and-white films
1946 comedy films
1940s English-language films
Films based on works by Louis Verneuil
Films directed by John Berry
Films scored by Robert Emmett Dolan
Paramount Pictures films
American films based on plays
Remakes of American films
1940s American films